Mark O'Connor (born 17 January 1997) is a professional Australian rules footballer playing for the Geelong Football Club in the Australian Football League (AFL).

Early life
O'Connor is a native of Daingean Uí Chúis, a town in an Irish-speaking region of County Kerry, Ireland. Mark is the oldest of a set of triplets, with his identical sisters Sinead & Brydie still living in Ireland. Prior to leaving for Australia, O'Connor studied commerce at University College Cork.

Gaelic football career

O'Connor is particularly noted for his spectacular high fielding ability in Gaelic football, being described as one of the brightest stars of Kerry football prior to his move to Australia. O'Connor won two All-Ireland minor football medals with Kerry in 2014 and 2015. He captained the side and won the Man of the Match award in the 2015 final. He also won two Hogan Cup titles with his school Pobalscoil Chorca Dhuibhne in both those years.

O'Connor hopes to represent the Kerry senior football team in the future, as it is his dream to so. Colm O'Rourke wrote after the 2019 All-Ireland Senior Football Championship Final loss to Dublin that O'Connor was the midfielder Kerry "badly need to take some of the load off David Moran".

Australian rules career
Having had trials at five AFL sides, North Melbourne, Melbourne and Geelong all expressed interest in acquiring his services.
He was drafted by Geelong from Kerry GAA in Ireland as a category B rookie in October 2016. He made his debut in the seventeen point loss against  at the Melbourne Cricket Ground in round eight of the 2017 AFL season.

In 2022 he and Zach Tuohy became only the second and third Irish players to win an AFL title, following Tadhg Kennelly in 2005.

Statistics
Updated to the end of the 2022 season.

|-
| 2017 ||  || 42
| 2 || 0 || 0 || 4 || 17 || 21 || 4|| 5 || 0.0 || 0.0 || 2.0 || 8.5 || 10.5 || 2.0 || 2.5 || 0
|-
| 2018 ||  || 42
| 5 || 0 || 0 || 37 || 21 || 58 || 23 || 9 || 0.0 || 0.0 || 7.4 || 4.2 || 11.6 || 4.6 || 1.8 || 0
|-
| 2019 ||  || 42
| 23 || 1 || 0 || 195 || 127 || 322 || 104 || 61 || 0.0 || 0.0 || 8.5 || 5.5 || 14.0 || 4.5 || 2.7 || 0
|-
| 2020 ||  || 42
| 21 || 2 || 0 || 158 || 80 || 238 || 87 || 31 || 0.1 || 0.0 || 7.5 || 3.8 || 11.3 || 4.1 || 1.5 || 0
|-
| 2021 ||  || 42
| 14 || 1 || 0 || 111 || 95 || 206 || 48 || 40 || 0.1 || 0.0 || 7.9 || 6.8 || 14.7 || 3.4 || 2.9 || 1
|-
| scope=row bgcolor=F0E68C | 2022# ||  || 42
| 22 || 0 || 4 || 171 || 106 || 277 || 84 || 56 || 0.0 || 0.2 || 7.8 || 4.8 || 12.6 || 3.8 || 2.5 || 0
|- class=sortbottom
! colspan=3 | Career
! 87 !! 4 !! 4 !! 676 !! 446 !! 1122 !! 350 !! 202 !! 0.0 !! 0.0 !! 7.8 !! 5.1 !! 12.9 !! 4.0 !! 2.3 !! 1
|}

Notes

Honours and achievements
Team
 AFL premiership player: 2022
 2× McClelland Trophy: 2019, 2022

References

External links

1997 births
Living people
Gaelic footballers who switched code
Geelong Football Club players
Geelong Football Club Premiership players
Irish players of Australian rules football
People from Dingle
One-time VFL/AFL Premiership players